Pushpa Kumari Karna Kayasta is a Nepali communist politician and a member of the House of Representatives of the federal parliament of Nepal. She represents Communist Party of Nepal (Unified Socialist) in the parliament, where she is also a member of the Parliamentary Public Accounts Committee.

She was elected to parliament under the proportional representation system from CPN UML filling the reserved seat for women and Madhesi groups.

References

Living people
Place of birth missing (living people)
21st-century Nepalese women
21st-century Nepalese politicians
Nepal Communist Party (NCP) politicians
Communist Party of Nepal (Unified Socialist) politicians
Madhesi people
Nepal MPs 2017–2022
Communist Party of Nepal (Unified Marxist–Leninist) politicians
1960 births